Jodugullapalem is a  neighbourhood of Visakhapatnam, India. It is situated between Sagar Nagar and Kailasagiri.

Jodugullapalem's name is derived from twin temples, and it is one of the old settlements in Visakhapatnam.

References

Neighbourhoods in Visakhapatnam